Leslie Charles Wylie (1887–1959) was a professional rugby league footballer in the New South Wales Rugby League (NSWRL).

Playing career
Born in Berrima, New South Wales, Wylie played for the Eastern Suburbs club in the 1910 season.  He made his debut against Western Suburbs in round 1 of the 1910 season scoring a try in a 24–14 victory.  His final game for Eastern Suburbs came in round 14 against Glebe as Easts ran out winners 36–0.

References

The Encyclopedia of Rugby League; Alan Whiticker and Glen Hudson

1887 births
1959 deaths
Australian rugby league players
Rugby league centres
Rugby league five-eighths
Rugby league players from New South Wales
Sydney Roosters players